RooR (stylized as ROOЯ) is a Frankenthal-based company that produces high-end borosilicate ground glass joint bongs. It was founded 1995 by Martin Birzle, a German glass-blower.

History

ROOR was founded in 1995 by Martin Birzle. The philosophy behind ROOR was based on intensive focus of glassblowing craftsmanship and extraordinary artworks. One of the unique processes behind ROOR glass is the balance between volume and water for which they aim to achieve an optimum ratio.

In the first 4 years ROOR company was managed solely by Martin Birzle; collecting orders, manufacturing, and shipping. However, as the company grew, it was no longer possible for Martin to operate on his own. The company began hiring employees.

ROOR has expanded into the Southern California Market.

Counterfeits
RooR is frequently counterfeited. Beginning in 2013, RooR took legal action against stores in Florida, California, and New York for which they accused of selling counterfeit RooR products.

References

External links
 

Cannabis paraphernalia companies
Cannabis smoking
Cannabis in Germany
German companies established in 1995
1995 in cannabis
Glassmaking companies of Germany
Companies based in Rhineland-Palatinate